Ameriprise Financial Center is a  in Minneapolis, Minnesota located at 707 2nd Avenue South. It was completed in 2000 and has 31 floors. It is the tallest building completed in the US in 2000. 

This building is the largest single-tenant skyscraper in downtown Minneapolis. The headquarters of Ameriprise Financial (formerly American Express Financial Advisors) moved here from the IDS Tower in April 2000. A skyway connects the building to the Capella Tower, Baker Center, and Accenture Tower. A mixture of glass and granite on units, usually 5 feet wide by 15 feet tall (1.5 by 4.6 m), is used on the wall. Unitized aluminum framing, glass and granite were also used on the building. It sits on the site of the old Lutheran Brotherhood Building, which was demolished to make way for this building. The building was purchased in September 2016 by Morning Calm Management, a commercial real estate management firm from West Palm Beach, Florida.

See also
List of tallest buildings in Minneapolis

References

Skyscraper office buildings in Minneapolis
Financial services company headquarters in the United States
Office buildings completed in 2000
2000 establishments in Minnesota
HKS, Inc. buildings
Leadership in Energy and Environmental Design basic silver certified buildings